The Rarotonga Steam Railway was a short tourist railway on Rarotonga in the Cook Islands.

History 

Around 1914 the Union Steam Ship Company of New Zealand had railway tracks in Avarua's wharf.
There was no railway line in operation on the Cook Islands until the beginning of the 1990s. 
In 1991 or 1992 resident of Rarotonga, Tim Arnold, a descendant of Field Marshal Gebhard Leberecht von Blücher, purchased a steam locomotive in Poland and brought it to Avarua.
It was working steam locomotive; a 750mm gauge Polish 0-8-0. In Poland, it was -1741. It was built in 1951 by the Pierwsza Fabryka Lokomotyw w Polsce Fablok in Chrzanów, Poland with the serial number 2126.

The railway is in need of repair, and as such is no longer in working condition.

The locomotive and other equipment are stored on the island awaiting possible further use.
There is a proposal  to transfer the unused locomotive to the new narrow-gauge railway near Lake Wakatipu in New Zealand.

The Px48-1741 steam locomotive was used in Poland on the local railways in Krośniewice, Kaliska and Żuławska.

References

750 mm gauge railways in the Cook Islands
Railways in the Cook Islands
Rarotonga